Väino Reinart (born 28 December 1962 in Kuressaare) is an Estonian diplomat.

Since 1992, he has worked for Ministry of Foreign Affairs. 1995–1999, he was Permanent Representative of Estonia to the Organisation for Security and Cooperation in Europe (OSCE) in Vienna. 2007–2011, he was Ambassador of Estonia to the United States, Mexico and Canada. Since 2012, he has been the Estonian Ambassador to Afghanistan.

Since 2018, he is Ambassador of Estonia to Japan.

References

Living people
1962 births
Estonian diplomats
Ambassadors of Estonia to the United States
Ambassadors of Estonia to Canada
Ambassadors of Estonia to Mexico
Ambassadors of Estonia to Japan
Tallinn University of Technology alumni
People from Kuressaare